Josef Bertalan (born 29 September 1934) is an Austrian former footballer.

References

1934 births
Living people
Association football forwards
Austrian footballers
SK Rapid Wien players